Gary John Webster (born 3 February 1964 in Whitechapel, East London) is an English actor.

Webster's first major TV role was in EastEnders playing Graham Clark from 1987 until 1988. He later became better known for playing Ray Daley in the television series Minder, replacing Dennis Waterman as George Cole's on-screen sparring partner in the series. Webster joined the series in 1991 and remained until its conclusion in 1994.

Subsequent to this Webster took roles in soap operas. He made a brief appearance in Hollyoaks as Dion in 2001, and in Crossroads as Richard Mason the same year. He was later a regular in serial Family Affairs, playing Gary Costello from 2003 until the series ended at the end of 2005. He played tough drugs baron Paul Haskew in ITV drama series The Bill. In 2016, he returned to EastEnders, this time playing Neville Peacock in four episodes.

Personal life 
He has been married to Wendy Turner, the sister of Anthea Turner, since 1999 and they have two sons.

He was interviewed on BBC Breakfast on 27 May 2008 about his forthcoming book, Debt Rescue: How to Get Through a Year of Financial Ruin...and Survive! The book follows Webster's debt problems, which began in his first series of Minder and included repossession of his property.

In autumn 2011 he suffered a "significant heart attack". He underwent heart surgery.

Filmography

Empire State (1987) - Paul's man
EastEnders (1988 and 2016) - Graham Clark/Neville Peacock 
The Bill (1990, 2002 and 2007) - Paul Haskew/Darren Saunders 
Minder (1991–1994) - Ray Daley
Hollyoaks (2001) - Dion
Family Affairs (2003–2005) - Gary Costello
The Dumping Ground (2020) - Al Winters

References

External links 
 

1964 births
Living people
English male soap opera actors
Male actors from London
People from Whitechapel
20th-century English male actors
21st-century English male actors